A conqueror is a person who conquers.

Conqueror, The Conqueror or The Conquerors may also refer to:

Military
 , various British Royal Navy ships
 Conqueror-class monitor, a Royal Navy ship class
 , a US Navy coastal minesweeper
 Conqueror tank, a British post-World War II heavy tank

Arts and entertainment

Film and television
 The Conqueror (1917 film), a silent biographical western
 The Conquerors (1932 film), an American frontier saga/western 
 The Conqueror (1956 film), a 1956 epic starring John Wayne as Genghis Khan
 The Conqueror, a 1990 episode of the cartoon Captain Planet and the Planeteers
 The Conquerors (TV series), a 2005 American series covering great leaders' lives
 The Conquerors (2013 film), a French adventure/road movie comedy

Music

Albums
 Conqueror (Jesu album), 2007
 Conqueror (Gates of Slumber album), 2008
 Conqueror (Band-Maid album), 2019

Songs
 "Conqueror" (Estelle song), 2014
 "Conqueror" (Aurora song), 2016
 "The Conqueror", a 1912 arrangement by Louis-Philippe Laurendeau of the 1903 German march "Graf Zeppelin" by Carl Teike

Other
 Conqueror Records, an American record label

Novels
 The Conqueror (novel), a 1931 novel written by Georgette Heyer
 Conqueror (novel series), a series of novels by Conn Iggulden
 Conqueror (Iggulden novel), a 2011 book by Conn Iggulden, last book of the Conqueror series
 Conqueror (Baxter novel), a 2007 science fiction novel by Stephen Baxter

Pro wrestling
 Brock Lesnar (born 1977), called "The Conqueror"
 Sheamus (born 1978), called "The Celtic Conqueror"

Board games
 The Conquerors (board game), a 1977 board wargame set in Ancient history

Video games
 Conqueror (video game), a 1988 tank command video game
 Age of Empires II: The Conquerors, 1999 real-time strategy game

Other uses
 List of people known as the Conqueror
 Conqueror (paper manufacturer), founded in the late 1880s by E.P. Barlow
 Curtiss V-1570 Conqueror, a 1926 aircraft engine

See also

 Conqueror A.D. 1086, a 1995 medieval strategy computer game
 Konqueror, a KDE-based web browser and file manager
 Conkeror, a Mozilla-based web browers
 
 Conquistador (disambiguation)
 Conquest (disambiguation)
 Conquer (disambiguation)